Elections were held in the Australian state of Queensland on 1 November 1986 to elect the 89 members of the state's Legislative Assembly. It followed a redistribution which increased the number of seats in the Assembly from 82 to 89.

The election resulted in a seventh consecutive term for the National Party under Sir Joh Bjelke-Petersen. It was the 11th consecutive term for the National Party in Queensland since it first came to office in 1957.  The Nationals secured a majority in their own right, with 49 seats.  It is the only time that the Nationals have ever won enough seats to govern alone in an election at any level.  They had come up one seat short of an outright majority in 1983, but picked up a majority after persuading two Liberals to cross the floor.

This was the last time that a non-Labor Government was elected at a Queensland state election until 2012, although the Coalition briefly held government from 1996 to 1998 following the Mundingburra by-election.

Key dates

Overview
All three parties had high hopes for the election. The Nationals knew that they needed to increase their number of seats to hang onto Government (they had held a majority of one in the last Parliament, which had been increased from 82 seats to 89 for the 1986 election). The Liberals desperately needed to win back some of their losses from their disastrous performance in 1983, and Labor hoped to exploit disunity between the conservative parties to make gains.

The already malapportioned boundaries (the "Bjelkemander") had been redrawn earlier in the year in a manner which further advantaged the National Party.

Result

The Bjelke-Petersen Government won a commanding victory, winning an extra eight seats and thus increasing its majority. The Liberals gained two seats, but were still nowhere near making up for their 1983 losses. Labor lost two seats.

|}

Seats changing hands

 Members listed in italics did not recontest their seats.
 In addition, the Liberal party gained Stafford in the 1984 by-election, and retained it this election.
 Caboolture was a notionally Labor-held seat and Townsville was a notionally National-held seat in the redistribution before the election.

Post-election pendulum

Significance
The 1986 election is significant for a number of reasons. It saw the National Party retain a majority of seats in the Parliament, and it was only the second election in Australian history (the other being the 1983 Queensland election) in which the National Party won enough seats to form Government in its own right.

More importantly, Sir Joh Bjelke-Petersen's victory gave him the confidence to launch the 'Joh for Canberra' campaign, which would play a major part in the 1987 federal election, and would later be a major factor in his undoing.

See also
 Members of the Queensland Legislative Assembly, 1983–1986
 Members of the Queensland Legislative Assembly, 1986–1989
 Candidates of the Queensland state election, 1986

Notes

References

Elections in Queensland
1986 elections in Australia
1980s in Queensland
November 1986 events in Australia